Dettum station is a railway station in the municipality of Dettum, located in the Wolfenbüttel district in Lower Saxony, Germany.

References

Railway stations in Lower Saxony
Buildings and structures in Wolfenbüttel (district)